Brookton Highway is a  long undivided single carriageway highway in Western Australia, running from the southern Perth suburb of Kelmscott, through Westdale, to the southern Wheatbelt town of Brookton. It is signposted as State Route 40; however, the route and highway continue on far past Brookton, passing through Corrigin, Kondinin, Hyden, Lake King, and finishing at South Coast Highway, just west of Ravensthorpe.

Route description

Near its western terminus, the road passes through thick jarrah forest in the Darling Scarp; however further east, the landscape soon becomes flat, passing through wheat farming regions and wandoo woodlands until reaching Brookton.

The highway is a part of the route linking Perth to Esperance and is identified as a strategic freight and tourist route.
Tourism traffic, particularly to Wave Rock, is also prevalent along the western stretch of the road.

History

The bushfire in Kelmscott and Roleystone on 6 February 2011 destroyed the Buckingham Bridge. The bridge had originally been built from timber in 1935. Heavy vehicles were unable to use the structure and had to detour at Welshpool Road. This part of the highway is used by up to 4,000 vehicles per day.

The Buckingham Bridge was replaced with a permanent concrete and steel bridge, constructed to the south of the temporary crossing so that traffic was not disturbed. The new Buckingham Bridge was opened to traffic on 25 July 2013.

Major intersections

See also

 Highways in Australia
 List of highways in Western Australia

References

Highways and freeways in Perth, Western Australia
Highways in rural Western Australia
Wheatbelt (Western Australia)